Ratanpur may refer to:

Places
 Ratanpur, Bhopal (census code 482467), a village in Madhya Pradesh
 Ratanpur, Bhopal (census code 482555), another village in Madhya Pradesh
 Ratanpur, Chhattisgarh, a town and formerly princely state in Chhattisgarh
 Ratanpur Dhamanka, a town and formerly princely state in Kathiawar, Gujarat
 Ratanpur Miri Gaon, a village in Assam
 Ratanpur, Purba Bardhaman, a village in West Bengal
 Ratanpur, Raebareli, a village in Uttar Pradesh
 Ratanpur Union, a union council in Satkhira District, Bangladesh

Other uses
 Ratanpur (film), a 2018 Gujarati film
 Ratanpur Group, a Bangladeshi conglomerate

See also
 Ratua Ratanpur, a village in Berasia tehsil, Bhopal district, Madhya Pradesh
 Ratnapur (disambiguation)
 Ratanpura
 Ratanpura, Churu district